Nicetius can refer to: 

Nicetius, bishop of Trier
Nicetius of Lyon, bishop of Lyon
Nicetius of Provence, rector of Provence